Nemesio “Totoy” S. Baldesco Sr. (born ) is a Filipino poet and pedicab driver from Calbayog, Samar who primarily does literary works in Waray. He is a recipient of Gawad Parangal of UMPIL (Unyon ng mga Manunulat sa Pilipinas). He is known as the “Father of Waray Poetry” (Amay han Siday).

He was also given the Gantimpalang Ani Award for Poetry in 1994 by the Cultural Center of the Philippines (CCP) and the Gawad Komisyon Karangalang Banggit for Poetry by the Komisyon sa Wikang Filipino (KWF) in 2007.

Personal life 
Baldesco is married to Ana Baldesco who is also a writer. They have children who are also involved in arts and literature.

References
 

Living people
Year of birth missing (living people)
People from Calbayog
21st-century Filipino poets
Filipino male poets
Waray-language writers